Gary Brook (born 9 May 1964) is an English former footballer.

He played for Frickley Athletic, Newport County, Scarborough, Blackpool, Notts County and Ossett Town

Victories under his stewardship include a 4–0 away win at Harrogate Town and a 5–2 home victory over Radcliffe Borough.

References

1964 births
Living people
Association football forwards
Blackpool F.C. players
Bradford (Park Avenue) A.F.C. managers
English Football League players
English football managers
English footballers
Footballers from Dewsbury
Frickley Athletic F.C. players
Gainsborough Trinity F.C. managers
Newport County A.F.C. players
Notts County F.C. players
Ossett Town F.C. managers
Ossett Town F.C. players
Scarborough F.C. players